Stockyards, colloquially the Stockyards or simply the Yards, is a neighborhood on the West Side of Cleveland, Ohio. It is located between I-71 to the south, roughly Ridge Road to the west, West 44th Street to the east, and just south of I-90 to the north. The neighborhood has been historically home to significant communities of Hungarians and Czechs, and since the 1980s, it has also been home to a growing Hispanic community.

References

External links

Metro West Community Development Organization

Hungarian-American history
Hungarian-American culture in Cleveland
Czech-American culture in Cleveland
Hispanic and Latino American culture in Ohio
Neighborhoods in Cleveland